Tetiana Dovzhenko is a Ukrainian female rhythmic gymnast. She is member of Ukrainian rhythmic gymnastics national team since 2017. At the 2018 Rhythmic Gymnastics World Championships in Sofia she won bronze medal in team event.

References

External links 
 Tetiana's Profile

2002 births
Living people
Ukrainian rhythmic gymnasts
Sportspeople from Donetsk
Gymnasts at the 2019 European Games
European Games silver medalists for Ukraine
European Games medalists in gymnastics
21st-century Ukrainian women